Cyperus fissus is a species of sedge that is native to Africa and Arabia.

The species was first formally described by the botanist Ernst Gottlieb von Steudel in 1842.

See also
 List of Cyperus species

References

fissus
Plants described in 1842
Taxa named by Ernst Gottlieb von Steudel
Flora of Ethiopia
Flora of Yemen